Vomit may refer to:

Vomiting
The substance that is vomited.
Emesis
Fake vomit, a novelty item designed to look like mucus or vomit

People
Vicki Vomit (born 1963), German musician and comedian

Musical groups
Death Vomit, Indonesian death metal group
Vomit Launch, American indie rock group

See also
 Barf (disambiguation)
 Puke (disambiguation)
 Vomitorium